Football Manager 2023 (officially abbreviated as FM23) is a football management simulation video game developed by Sports Interactive and published by Sega. It is part of its Football Manager series. It was released on November 8, 2022 for most platforms, with early access beginning two weeks prior for PC and Mac, and the full game release for the PlayStation 5 having been delayed. Football Manager 2023 Console, titled Xbox Edition in Football Manager 2022, is to be available on both Xbox and PlayStation consoles, making its debut on the latter; Football Manager 2023 Mobile is available on both Android and iOS devices; and Football Manager 2023 Touch was released on both the Nintendo Switch and Apple Arcade.

History 
In November 2022, the much-anticipated Football Manager 2023 Console for the PlayStation 5 was delayed days prior to its release to an unannounced date. On January 25, 2023, it was announced the inaugural PlayStation 5 edition of the game would be released on February 1.

Features 
As opposed to previous games in the series, FM23 licensed UEFA club competitions. As part of the licensing agreement, the UEFA Women's Champions League will debut in a future version of the game. The packaging has been improved to reduce its carbon footprint by 53%.

References 

2023
Video games developed in the United Kingdom
2022 video games
Android (operating system) games
IOS games
MacOS games
Nintendo Switch games
Windows games
Xbox One games
Xbox Series X and Series S games
PlayStation 5 games